Sambuca Pistoiese is a town and comune of  the   Province of Pistoia in the Italian region of Tuscany. The nearest railway station is that of Ponte della Venturina,  from Pàvana.

Twin towns 
Sambuca Pistoiese is twinned with:

  Amgala, Western Sahara

References

External links
 

Cities and towns in Tuscany